Gunnera monoica is a species of Gunnera endemic to New Zealand. It spreads by forming stolons in damp ground.

G. monoica flowers between October and November, and produces fruit from December until February. This fruit is barrel shaped and white in colour, though some varieties may have purple or red flecks. The leaves have a rounded appearance and either a corrugated or spiky margin.

References

Notes

Bibliography

monoica
Flora of New Zealand